Anthicus is a genus of antlike flower beetles in the family Anthicidae. There are at least 100 described species in Anthicus.

See also
 List of Anthicus species

References

Further reading

External links

 

Anthicidae
Tenebrionoidea genera